Khalilur Rahman Babar/ Actor Babar (3 February 1952 – 26 August 2019) was a Bangladeshi film actor, director and producer who acted mainly negative roles in films. He acted in more than 300 films.

Biography
Babar was born on 3 February 1952 in Gendaria, Dhaka. He made his debut in the film arena with Banglar Mukh of Amjad Hossain. He was the lead actor in this film. But, he made his negative role debut on Rangbaz. His last film was Tero Gunda Ek Panda.

Besides acting in films he produced Dagi. He directed Doyaban, Dagi, Dadavai too. He has also produced and directed several Bengali drama for different television channels.

Babar died in Square Hospital on 26 August 2019 at the age of 67.

During his departure he left his wife Sultana Rahman, son Riadur Rahman, daughter O Rahman, son in law Richard Kareem, Daughter in Law Sanam and only grand daughter Zaara (OZKK).

References

2019 deaths
1952 births
People from Dhaka District
Bangladeshi male film actors
Bangladeshi film directors
Bangladeshi film producers